Saltville Historic District is a national historic district located at Saltville, Smyth County, Virginia. The district includes 104 contributing buildings and 3 contributing sites in the central business district and surrounding residential areas of Saltville. It includes a variety of residential and commercial buildings primarily dating from the late-19th to mid-20th centuries.  Notable buildings and sites include Well Fields, Saltville Golf Course, Office Building (1850), Mathieson Alkali Office Building (1894), company store (1895), First National Bank of Saltville, St. Paul's Episcopal Church (1896),  Gothic Revival style Madam Russell Memorial United Methodist Church, Duplex House (1894), Saltville Post Office (1931), Piggly-Wiggly Store, Saltville Savings Bank (1920), and Saltville Town Hall (1949).

It was listed on the National Register of Historic Places in 2000.

References

Historic districts in Smyth County, Virginia
Gothic Revival architecture in Virginia
Neoclassical architecture in Virginia
National Register of Historic Places in Smyth County, Virginia
Historic districts on the National Register of Historic Places in Virginia